Sebastián Javier Francini (born 8 September 1989, in Merlo, Buenos Aires Province, Argentina) is an Argentine actor and singer.

Biography 
Sebastián Javier Francini was born on 8 September 1989, in Merlo, Buenos Aires Province, Argentina. Sebastián Francini is the son of Claudio and Martha.

Filmography

Television

Theater

Television Programs

Movies

Discography

 1998 — Chiqutitias Vol. 4
 1999 — Chiqutitias Vol 5.
 2000 — Chiqutitias Vol. 6
 2001 — Chiquititas Vol. 7
 2001 — Chiquititas: Rincón de Luz

Awards and nominations

References

External links
 

Argentine male child actors
Argentine male film actors
20th-century Argentine male singers
Argentine male stage actors
Argentine male telenovela actors
Argentine male television actors
Male actors from Buenos Aires
Singers from Buenos Aires
1989 births
Living people
21st-century Argentine male singers